Vojpatia Union is an Union Parishad under Rampal Upazila of Bagerhat District in the division of Khulna, Bangladesh. It has an area of 26.03 km2 (10.05 sq mi) and a population of 10,495.

References

Unions of Rampal Upazila
Unions of Bagerhat District
Unions of Khulna Division